Sir George Martin (1926–2016) was an English record producer.

George Martin may also refer to:

Arts and entertainment

Actors
George Martin (Spanish actor) (1937–2021), Spanish film actor
George Martin (American actor) (1929–2010), American television, stage, and film actor
George André Martin (1910–1957), French actor and variety performer

Writers
George R. R. Martin (born 1948), American author of A Song of Ice and Fire (adapted as Game of Thrones)
George Madden Martin (1866–1946), American fiction writer
George Victor Martin (1900–1959), American writer

Other media
George Martin (comedian) (1922–1991), British comedian, musician, scriptwriter and broadcaster
George Martin (organist) (1844–1916), organist at St Paul's Cathedral (1888)
George William Martin, English musical composer
George Martin, character in the film 84 Charing Cross Road

Law and politics
George B. Martin (1876–1945), U.S. Senator from Kentucky
George Bohun Martin (1842–1933), English-born farmer, rancher and political figure in British Columbia, Canada
George Washington Martin II (1876–1948), lawyer and jurist in Brooklyn, New York
George Ewing Martin (1857–1948), United States federal judge
George Martin (Tasmanian politician) (1876–1946), member of the Tasmanian Parliament
George Martin (Queensland politician) (1858–1905), member of the Queensland Legislative Assembly
George Martin (Michigan judge) (1815–1867) Justice of the Michigan Supreme Court

Sports

Cricket
George Martin (Kent cricketer) (1833–1876), English cricketer who played for Kent
George Martin (Nottinghamshire cricketer) (1845–1900), English cricketer who played for Nottinghamshire
George Martin (Otago cricketer) (1869–1961), New Zealand cricketer who played for Otago
George Martin (Hampshire cricketer) (1875–1957), English cricketer who played for Hampshire 
George Martin (Glamorgan cricketer) (1880–1962), Glamorgan cricketer

Other sports
George Martin (Gaelic footballer) (1877–1934), Gaelic footballer
George Martin (Scottish footballer) (1899–1972), Scottish footballer and manager
George Martin (American football) (born 1953), American football defensive end
George Martin (footballer, born 1875) (1875–1943), Australian rules footballer for Essendon
George Martin (footballer, born 1883) (1883–1964), Australian rules footballer for Melbourne
George Graham Martin (born 1933), South African footballer
George Martin (rugby league) (1931–2017), New Zealand rugby league footballer
George Martin (rugby union) (born 2001), English rugby union player

Others
George Martin (Royal Navy officer) (1764–1847), Royal Navy admiral of the fleet
George Willard Martin (1886–1971), American mycologist
George Martin (priest) (1864–1946), priest in the Church of England
George Dennis Martin (1847–1915), English architect
George C. Martin (1910–2003), project engineer for Boeing
George M. Martin (1927-2022), American biogerontologist
George Henry Martin Johnson, hereditary chief of the Mohawk of the Six Nations in Canada

See also
Moto Martin, founded by Georges Martin